Brent Barraclough is a classical pianist and film producer who was born in Canada in 1962 and is of British citizenship. He studied piano at the Juilliard School (New York) and McGill University (Montreal). His principal piano teachers were Ruth Laredo, "America's First Lady of the Piano" and Thomas C. Plaunt. He also studied business and philosophy at New York University, University of Toronto, and Sauder School of Business (University of British Columbia).

He is known for his work as actor and producer in both The French Guy and 2 Days Later with Jools Holland. He was a national Director of The Drake Music Project and Chief Executive of "Live Music Now!" in London, England. He was also host of the Shaw Cable TV show Noteworthy in the early 1980s.

He was elected as a Fellow of the Royal Society of Arts (UK) in 2001. The RSA is a prestigious society that includes among its former members Benjamin Franklin, Charles Dickens and John Diefenbaker.

He is a member of The American Bach Society.

In 2012 he served on the Hnatyshyn Foundation Piano Jury with Anton Kuerti and Louise Bissette.

References

1962 births
British classical pianists
Canadian male film actors
Canadian classical pianists
Male classical pianists
Living people
21st-century classical pianists
21st-century British male musicians